Rachmad Gobel (born 3 September 1962) is an Indonesian businessman and politician from Gorontalo. His family controls the company, Gobel Group which is now called PT. Panasonic Gobel Indonesia, an Indonesian division of Panasonic. He is also the former Minister of Trade and the Indonesian President's Special Envoy to Japan. Currently, he is the Deputy Speaker of the People's Representative Council.

Early life 
Gobel is the fifth child and first male son of the Thayeb Mohammad Gobel and Annie Nento Gobel from Gorontalo. Thayeb Gobel was well known as the founder of the business group and pioneered electronics industry in Indonesia. From childhood he was educated to become the heir and leader of the Gobel business group, founded and led by his father. After graduating from high school in Jakarta in 1981, Rachmad Gobel chose to continue his studies in Japan at the Chuo University. After four years he completed his studies at the Department of International Trade.

Career

Panasonic Gobel Indonesia 
In 1989, Gobel returned to Indonesia and was appointed assistant to the President Director of PT. Panasonic Gobel (now PT. Panasonic Indonesia). The company is a joint venture between Japan with Indonesia in the field of industrial manufacturing of electronics, which was established in 1970. In 1991, Gobel was officially appointed as member of the board of directors to oversee company's management planning.

In 1993, he was appointed Vice President Director of PT. National Gobel (now PT. Panasonic Manufacturing Indonesia). Since 2002, Rachmad has served as Commissioner of PT. National Gobel (now PT. Panasonic Manufacturing Indonesia). He is also the principle at PT. Apple Indonesia.

Chamber of Commerce Indonesia 
In 2002, Gobel sat as Chairman of Kadin Indonesia Field of Metal, Machinery, Chemicals and Electronics. When a change of leadership occurred in Chamber of Commerce and Industry of Indonesia the chairman Mohamad Suleman Hidayat in February 2004 Rachmad was reappointed for another four years.

Minister for Trade 
Gobel was appointed by President Joko Widodo as Trade Minister in the Working Cabinet in 2014. He was one of the ministers selected from a professional representative. One year after his appointment, due to a cabinet reshuffle, he was removed as minister. He was replaced by Thomas Trikasih Lembong.

Parliament 
Gobel ran for a legislative seat in the 2019 elections, and was elected into the People's Representative Council representing Gorontalo after winning 146,067 seats. He was appointed as one of the body's deputy speakers.

Education 
In 1984, Gobel attended Chuo University in Tokyo, Japan where he graduated with a Bachelors of International Trade Studies. In 2002, he received an honorary Doctorate from the Takushoku University. In 2014, he received another honorary doctorate from Takushoku University.

References 

1962 births
Living people
Indonesian business executives
Working Cabinet (Joko Widodo)
Trade ministers of Indonesia
Nasdem Party politicians
Politicians from Gorontalo (province)
Members of the People's Representative Council, 2019